= Ghosts of Darkness =

- Directed by: David Ryan Keith
- Written by: David Ryan Keith
- Produced by: Lorraine Keith
- Starring: Michael Koltes; Paul Flannery; Steve Weston; Lisa Livingstone
- Cinematography: David Ryan Keith
- Edited by: David Ryan Keith
- Music by: Niall Mathewson
- Production companies: Clear Focus Movies; Strong Oak Pictures
- Distributed by: Uncork'd Entertainment
- Release date: 7 March 2017
- Running time: 82 minutes
- Country: United Kingdom
- Language: English

Ghosts of Darkness (also known as House of Ghosts) is a 2017 British comedy horror film directed by David Ryan Keith, starring Michael Koltes, Paul Flannery and Steve Weston.

== Cast ==
- Michael Koltes as Jack Donovan
- Paul Flannery as Jonathan Blazer
- Steve Weston as Mysterious Man
- Lisa Livingstone as Rebecca Donovan
- Lisa Cameron as Laura Johnson
- Liam Matheson as Big Beard
- Morgan Faith Keith as Sarah Johnson
- Cameron Mowat as Mike Johnson
- Lindsay Cromar as Shotgun Victim

== Release ==
The film was released to VOD on 7 March 2017.

== Reception ==
Phil Wheat of Nerdly rated the film 5 stars out of 5, calling it "a perfect storm of filmmaking: everyone and everything coming together to create something sensational." Blacktooth of Horror Society gave the film a rating of 4 out of 5, writing that it has "an amazing cast and one hell of a story". James Evans of Starburst rated the film 7 stars out of 10, calling it "hugely likeable, frequently funny, and importantly a good time".

Ian Sedensky of Culture Crypt gave the film a score of 55 out of 100. Matt Boiselle of Dread Central rated the film 2.5 stars out of 5, writing that "this particular go-round has seen its tires’ treads ground down to a bald surface – “been there, done that” once again."
